The National Cycle Museum is a national museum dedicated to cycling in the United Kingdom and is based in Llandrindod Wells, Wales.

A collection of bicycles through the ages established in 1981 in premises on the estate of Belton House, near Grantham. After the house was donated to the National Trust the museum was without premises until a new location at Lincoln was offered.
James Maynard, Edward Skeet and Anthony Pickering took on the running of the museum after the originator and curator, Raymond Fixter died.
After several successful  years in Lincoln, the City of Lincoln council ceased sponsorship, and new premises were sought. In 1997 the Welsh Tourist board saw the opportunity of combining three collections (Tom Norton, David Higman and the National Cycle Museum) and offered premises in Llandrindod Wells, Powys.

The museum contains over 260 bicycles from an 1818 hobby-horse to the latest carbon-fibre designs, including a large collection of penny-farthings and solid-tyred safety bicycles, and cycling books, accessories and paraphernalia.

The building and site was known as The Automobile Palace, a project of bicycle shop owner Tom Norton, who bought the site in 1906 for his expanding business. The building was initially completed in 1911 in an Art Deco style and then tripled in size, to the same standard, in 1919. It has received a Grade II* heritage listing, being "an exceptionally early grid-pattern steel-framed building surviving largely unaltered".

References

External links 

Llandrindod Wells
History of cycling
Museums established in 1997
Museums in Powys
Transport museums in Wales
Cycling museums and halls of fame
Grade II* listed buildings in Powys
1997 establishments in Wales